Hortoki (Pron:/ˈlʊŋˌleɪ/) is a village, situated in the northwestern part of Mizoram state, northeastern India on the bank of River Tlawng. Hortoki is in the Kolasib district. The name Hortoki, is Bengali Language and ( in the native Mizo language), refers to the fruit of the reraw tree.

Hortoki is a large village located in N Thingdawl of Kolasib district, Mizoram, with 534 families and a population of 3060, of which 1680 were male and 1380 were females in the Population Census of 2011.

The population of children with age 0-6 is 435 which makes up 17.10% of total population of village. Average Sex Ratio of Hortoki village is 975 which is lower than Mizoram state average of 976. Child Sex Ratio for the Hortoki as per census is 1033, higher than Mizoram average of 970.

Hortoki has higher literacy rate compared to Mizoram. In 2011, literacy rate of Hortoki village was 98.44% compared to 91.33% of Mizoram. In Hortoki, male literacy was at 98.51% while female literacy rate was 98.36%.

As per constitution of India and Panchyati Raaj Act, Hortoki is administered by a sarpanch (head of village) who is the elected representative.

Villages in Kolasib district